4/10 may refer to:
April 10 (month-day date notation)
October 4 (day-month date notation)
The fraction 2/5, written in tenths

See also
2/5 (disambiguation)
10/4 (disambiguation)
410 (disambiguation)